The following highways are numbered S1

China
 S1 Expressway (Guangdong)
 S1 Expressway (Henan)
 S1 Expressway (Hubei)
 S1 Expressway (Shandong)
 S1 Expressway (Shanghai)
 S1 Expressway (Sichuan)
 S1 Expressway (Tianjin)
 S1 Expressway (Tibet)
 S1 Expressway (Zhejiang)

Georgia
 S1 Highway

Poland
 Expressway S1 (Poland)

United States
 New Jersey Route S1 (former)

See also
 List of highways numbered 1